Acanthoponera minor is a species of ant belonging to the genus Acanthoponera. Described in 1899 by Forel, the species is native to North America, Central America and South America.

References

Heteroponerinae
Hymenoptera of South America
Hymenoptera of North America
Insects of Mexico
Insects described in 1899